Ernest Lee Johnson (August 20, 1960 – October 5, 2021) was an American criminal convicted and executed for the murder of three convenience store employees in Boone County, Missouri in 1994. Johnson's execution by lethal injection proved controversial, as a 2008 surgery had removed up to 20 percent of his brain tissue, leaving Johnson permanently cognitively disabled.

Early life 
Johnson was born on August 20, 1960, in Steele, Missouri, and was raised by his grandmother in Charleston. His mother had substance abuse problems, including alcohol addiction, and Johnson had fetal alcohol spectrum disorder as a result. As an adult, Johnson was arrested and imprisoned for robbery and burglary, but he was released on parole in May 1993. Johnson also suffered from substance abuse in his adult life, and in January 1994, he asked his parole officer for assistance with alcohol addiction.

Murders and trial 
On February 12, 1994, Johnson killed three convenience store employees during an attempted robbery of a local Casey's in Columbia, Missouri: Mary Bratcher (46), Mable Scruggs (57), and Fred Jones (58). Johnson, who had been under the influence of cocaine at the time, had borrowed a .25-caliber pistol with the intention of robbing the store. When Bratcher attempted to destroy a key to the Casey's safe during the attempted robbery, Johnson became angry with his victims. He shot them with the borrowed gun before beating them to death with a claw hammer. Bratcher was also stabbed in the head with a screwdriver. Johnson then stored the bodies in the store's bathroom and cooler before fleeing the scene, disposing of most of his belongings in a nearby field. Bratcher and Scruggs were both mothers.

Johnson went to trial on May 11, 1995, in the Boone County Circuit Court. Prosecutor Kevin Crane told reporters that he would seek the death penalty for Johnson in connection to the murders. After a week of trial, the jury deliberated for two hours before reaching a verdict. On May 19, Johnson was convicted on three counts of first degree murder, with a recommendation that he be sentenced to death.

Brain surgery 
In 2008, Johnson underwent brain surgery to remove a tumor. The surgery was an incomplete success, with some tumor mass remaining, as well as scar tissue from the procedure, which led to Johnson developing epileptic seizures. Johnson feared that execution by lethal injection would result in painful seizures, and he requested that he be executed by firing squad instead. The request was denied, as the state of Missouri does not authorize use of a firing squad. It is estimated that the 2008 surgical procedure caused Johnson to lose up to 20 percent of his brain tissue; even before the surgery, however, his IQ scores ranged from 67 to 77, falling within the threshold of intellectual disability.

Execution 
With Johnson's execution approaching, his attorney, public defender Jeremy Weis, attempted to argue before the Missouri Supreme Court that Johnson's intellectual disability meant that execution would serve as a violation of the Eighth Amendment. On August 31, 2021, the Supreme Court rejected both Weis's claim of intellectual disability as well as his additional claim that execution by lethal injection would cause a painful seizure. As Johnson's case received more widespread media attention, a number of political and religious leaders petitioned Governor Mike Parson, in the days leading up to Johnson's death, to grant clemency. Among these petitioners were Rep. Cori Bush, Rep. Emanuel Cleaver, and Pope Francis. A number of anti-capital punishment activists also protested the execution outside of the Boone County Courthouse, petitioning Parson to halt the execution. Activists clarified that they were not asking the governor to release Johnson from prison, but that they were rather asking for a change in sentencing to life in prison.

On October 4, Parson released a statement saying that he would not grant clemency to Johnson, and that the execution would proceed as planned. Johnson died by lethal injection at 6:11 p.m. on Tuesday, October 5, 2021, at the Eastern Reception, Diagnostic and Correctional Center prison in Bonne Terre, Missouri. He read a written last statement aloud, apologizing for his actions, reiterating his love for his friends and family, and thanking those who had prayed on his behalf. As the injection began, he mouthed unknown words to his relatives. Johnson was formally pronounced dead nine minutes after receiving an injection of pentobarbital.

Johnson's last meal consisted of two double bacon cheeseburgers, onion rings, two large strawberry milkshakes and a large pizza.

See also 
 Capital punishment in Missouri
 List of people executed in Missouri
 List of people executed in the United States in 2021

References 

1960 births
2021 deaths
2021 controversies in the United States
2021 in American law
2021 in Missouri
20th-century African-American people
21st-century African-American people
21st-century executions by Missouri
21st-century executions of American people
American male criminals
American people convicted of murder
American people executed for murder
Executed people from Missouri
Executed African-American people
People convicted of murder by Missouri
October 2021 events in the United States
People executed by Missouri by lethal injection
People from Bonne Terre, Missouri
People from Charleston, Missouri